Susie Swanson (born June 21, 1948) is an American politician. She has served as a Republican member for the 64th district in the Kansas House of Representatives since 2015, succeeding her husband, Vern.

References

1948 births
Living people
People from Shawnee, Kansas
Women state legislators in Kansas
Republican Party members of the Kansas House of Representatives
21st-century American politicians
21st-century American women politicians
People from Clay Center, Kansas